The S type carriage stock was a type of steel passenger carriage operated by the New South Wales Government Railways from 1935 until 1989.

History
Between 1935 and 1937, Clyde Engineering built 35 first class BS carriages with 42 seats and 86 second class FS side corridor carriages with 64 seats at its Granville factory.

Over the years, they operated on services from express passenger and mail trains to branch line services. Withdrawals commenced in the 1970s but some lasted until the late 1980s on mail trains to Dubbo, Moree and Tenterfield and Interurban services to Newcastle, Bathurst, Goulburn and Bomaderry.

During the period spanning 1974 to 1982, eight were gutted internally and fitted with suburban throw over seating and Beclawat windows for use on interurban services. These received the IFS and MFS classifications. As at June 1986, 32 remained in service with the State Rail Authority.

Surviving S type cars

Preservation
Many were sold to preservation organisations with East Coast Heritage Rail, Canberra Railway Museum, Lachlan Valley Railway and New South Wales Rail Transport Museum (now NSW Rail Museum) all having operational examples. Four were purchased by Hamersley Iron in Western Australia for use with their preserved British steam locomotive 4079 Pendennis Castle.

Gallery

References

Railway coaches of New South Wales